KGPR (89.9 FM) is a non-profit radio station licensed to Great Falls, Montana. The station is owned by the Great Falls Public Radio Association, and it is an affiliate of Montana Public Radio, with programming originating locally  as well as from KUFM in Missoula, Montana. The KGPR studio is located on the campus of Great Falls College Montana State University.

References

External links
mtpr.org

µ
GPR
NPR member stations